6',7'-Dihydroxybergamottin is a natural furanocoumarin found in pomelos, grapefruits, and sour oranges, in both the peel and the pulp. Along with the chemically related compound bergamottin, it is believed to be responsible for a number of grapefruit–drug interactions, in which the consumption of citrus containing one or both of these compounds (especially grapefruit) affects the metabolism of a variety of pharmaceutical drugs.

References 

CYP3A4 inhibitors
Furanocoumarins
Terpeno-phenolic compounds
Vicinal diols